Cartwright is an English surname that originally means a maker of carts. Notable people with the surname include:

 Al Cartwright (1917–2015), American sportswriter
 Alan Cartwright (1945–2021), British musician
 Alexander Cartwright (1820–1892), American engineer and supposed inventor of baseball
 Angela Cartwright (born 1952), British-born American actress
 Ann Cartwright (born 1925), British statistician and socio-medical researcher
 Anthony Cartwright (cricketer) (born 1940), New Zealand cricketer
 Anthony Cartwright (writer) (born 1973), British novelist
 Arnaud Cartwright Marts (1888–1970), American academic, president of Bucknell University (1935–1945)
 Bec Cartwright (born 1983), Australian actress and singer
 Ben Cartwright (disambiguation), multiple people
 Bill Cartwright (born 1957), American basketball player
 Bill Cartwright (disambiguation), several people
 Brian Cartwright (born 1948), American lawyer and astrophysicist
 Bryce Cartwright (born 1994), Australian Rugby League player
 Buns Cartwright (1889–1976), English cricketer and soldier
 Caleb Cartwright (1696?–1763), Irish academic and clergyman
 Carol A. Cartwright, American academic, president of Kent State University (1991–2006) and Bowling Green State University (2008)
 Casimir Cartwright van Straubenzee (1867–1956), British soldier
 Christopher Cartwright (1602–1658), English clergyman
 Cyril Cartwright (cyclist), British cyclist
 D. F. Cartwright (1916–2009), British soldier, businessman and commercial fisherman
 David Cartwright (1920–1997), tenth Suffragan Bishop of Southampton
 Dave Cartwright (born 1943), British musician and author
 Deirdre Cartwright, British guitarist
 Ed Cartwright (1859–1933), American baseball player
 Edward David Cartwright (1920–1997), British bishop, Bishop of Southampton (1984–1989)
 Edmund Cartwright (1743–1823), British clergyman and inventor of the power loom
 Erik Cartwright (born 1950), musician
 Fairfax William Cartwright (1823–1881), British politician
 Fairfax Leighton Cartwright (1857–1928), British author and diplomat, Ambassador to Austria-Hungary (1908–1913)
 Gary Cartwright (born 1952), former Australian politician
 Geoff Cartwright, Australian actor
 George Cartwright (disambiguation), multiple people
 Greg Cartwright (born 1970), American musician
 Mrs H. Cartwright (fl. 1776 -1787), British writer
 Hannah Cartwright, a.k.a. Augustus Ghost, vocalist for Snow Ghosts
 Harold Cartwright (born 1951), English cricketer
 Hilton Cartwright (born 1990), Zimbabwean-Australian cricketer
 Hubert James Cartwright (1900–1958), Roman Catholic coadjutor bishop of the Roman Catholic Diocese of Wilmington
 Hugh Cartwright (died 1572), English politician
 Ian Cartwright (born 1964), English footballer
 James Cartwright (born 1949), American soldier, eighth Vice Chairman of the Joint Chiefs of Staff
 James Cartwright (canoeist) (born 1976), Canadian canoeist
 James Cartwright (disambiguation), multiple people
 Jim Cartwright (born 1958), English dramatist
 John Cartwright (disambiguation), multiple people
 Joe Cartwright (rugby league), English rugby league player
 Joseph Cartwright (disambiguation), multiple people
 Justin Cartwright (1945–2018), British novelist
 Julia Cartwright Ady (1851–1924), British art critic
 Kelly Cartwright (born 1989), Australian athlete
 Kit Cartwright (born 1954), American football administrator and a former American football player and coach
 Lee Cartwright (born 1972), English footballer
 Lionel Cartwright (born 1960), American country musician
 Lisa Cartwright, American scholar of visual culture
 Lynn Cartwright (1927–2004), American actress
 Mark Cartwright (born 1973), English footballer
 Matt Cartwright (born 1961), American lawyer and politician representing the 8th district of Pennsylvania in the US House of Representatives
 Mary Cartwright (1900–1998), British mathematician
 Nancy Cartwright (born 1957), American voice actress
 Nancy Cartwright (philosopher) (born 1943), American philosopher
 Oscar Ling Cartwright (1900–1983), American entomologist who specialized in scarab beetles
 Peggy Cartwright (1912–2001), Canadian silent-era actress
 Peter Cartwright (disambiguation), multiple people
 Philip Cartwright (1880-1955), English cricketer
 Randy Cartwright (born 1951), American animator
 Rianti Cartwright (born 1983), Indonesian actress, model and television presenter
 Richard Cartwright (disambiguation), multiple people
 Robert Cartwright, art director
 Rock Cartwright (born 1979), American football player
 Ryan Cartwright (born 1981), British actor
 Samuel Cartwright (1789–1864), British dentist
 Samuel A. Cartwright (1793–1863), Confederate States of America physician
 Silvia Cartwright (born 1943), New Zealand lawyer, 18th Governor-General of New Zealand (2001–2006)
 Steve Cartwright, American computer and video game designer
 Stephen Cartwright (1947–2004), British illustrator
 Thomas Cartwright (disambiguation), multiple people
 Tom Cartwright (1935–2007), English cricketer
 Veronica Cartwright (born 1949), English actress
 Vincent Cartwright (1882–1965), English rugby union player and cricketer
 Virginia Cartwright (born 1943), American artist
 Walter Cartwright (1871-????), English footballer
 Wilburn Cartwright (1892–1979), American lawyer and politician
 William Cartwright (disambiguation), multiple people

Fictional people
From the television series Bonanza:
 Adam Cartwright, the oldest child of Ben Cartwright
 Ben Cartwright (character), cattle rancher, patriarch of the Cartwright clan
 Hoss Cartwright, the middle son of Ben Cartwright
 Jamie Hunter Cartwright, the adopted son of Ben Cartwright
 Little Joe Cartwright, the youngest Cartwright

Other fictional characters:
 Fleet Admiral Cartwright, a character in the Star Trek universe
 Annie Cartwright, policewoman in Life on Mars
 Harold Cartwright, a protagonist from Grand Theft Auto: London 1969 and Grand Theft Auto: London 1961
 Helen Cartwright, one of the main characters from Nights: Journey of Dreams
 Lorna Cartwright, former character in EastEnders
 Madge Cartwright, the sole heiress to Cartwright's Soap Empire; and fiancée of Teddy Meldrum in You Rang, M'Lord
 Rosie Cartwright, member of The Sleepover Club
 Casey Cartwright, one of the main characters from Greek
 Rusty Cartwright, one of the main characters from Greek

See also 
 Cartwright (disambiguation)
 Wainwright (name)
 Wheelwright
 Wright (surname)

English-language surnames
Occupational surnames
English-language occupational surnames